Joseph Pierce may refer to:

 Joseph H. Pierce Jr. (1927–2018), American Thoroughbred racehorse owner and trainer
 Joseph Algernon Pearce (1893–1988), Canadian astrophysicist
 Joseph Alphonso Pierce (1902–1969), American mathematician and statistician